Tabo–Huai Yai Wildlife Sanctuary is a wildlife sanctuary in Bueng Sam Phan, Nong Phai, Mueang Phetchabun districts of Phetchabun Province and Nong Bua Daeng, Phakdi Chumphon districts of Chaiyaphum Province of Thailand.

Geography

Topography
Landscape is covered by forested mountains, such as Khao Khi Tao, Khao Lam Luk, Khao Pak Song, Khao Phraya Fo and Khao Tabo. The area is divided into 34% high slope mountain area (shallow valleys, mountain tops, upper slopes and deeply incised streams), 62% hill slope area (open slopes, midslope ridges and u-shaped valleys) and 4% plains.

Flora
The sanctuary features mixed deciduous forest (51%), dry evergreen forest (25%), agricultural area (16%), Abandoned farms (3%), dry deciduous forest (2%), degraded forest (2%) and savanna (1%).

Fauna
Mammals in the sanctuary are:

Birds with Hornbill sightings.
Reptiles in the sanctuary are:

Amphibians in the sanctuary are:

Location

See also
 List of protected areas of Thailand
 List of Protected Areas Regional Offices of Thailand

References

Wildlife sanctuaries of Thailand
Geography of Phetchabun province
Geography of Chaiyaphum province
Tourist attractions in Phetchabun province
Tourist attractions in Chaiyaphum province 
1997 establishments in Thailand
Protected areas established in 1997